F-body may refer to:

 Chrysler F platform
 GM F platform